Amirul Islam Chowdhury (born 1942) is a Bangladeshi academic. He served as the vice-chancellor of Jahangirnagar University and president of Asiatic Society of Bangladesh. He is currently a professor at the United International University.

Education
Chowdhury got his bachelor's and master's in economics from the University of Dhaka in 1961 and 1963 respectively. He earned his Ph.D. from the University of Wales in 1979. He later worked as a post-doctoral fellow at the Jawaharlal Nehru University during 1987–88.

Career
Chowdhury served as a research officer at the Ministry of Finance of the Government of Pakistan during June 1964 – April 1965. He was a faculty member of Jahangirnagar University at the Department of Economics from January 1971 until October 2004. He was also a professor of economics at North South University for five years. He served as the vice-chancellor of Jahangirnagar University during July 1994 until 1998 and also of Gano Bishwabidyalaya for a year.

Chowdhury was the Chairman of the Board of Directors of the state-run Sonali Bank from August 2001 until August 2002. He is currently serving as the vice chairman of Centre for Urban Studies, Dhaka. He was elected the president of Asiatic Society of Bangladesh on 3 January 2014.

References

Living people
University of Dhaka alumni
Alumni of the University of Wales
Academic staff of Jahangirnagar University
20th-century Bangladeshi economists
Vice-Chancellors of Jahangirnagar University
1942 births
Academic staff of the North South University
21st-century Bangladeshi economists